Ivaylo Ichkov Radentsov (born 29 May 1983, in Pleven) is a Bulgarian football player who plays as a midfielder for Levski 2007.

Career
Radentsov played for Dunav Ruse before moving to Litex Lovech in June 2017.  He left the club at the end of the 2017–18 season when his contract expired.

In July 2018, Radentsov returned to Spartak Pleven.

References

External links
 
 

Living people
1983 births
Sportspeople from Pleven
Bulgarian footballers
Association football midfielders
PFC Spartak Pleven players
PFC Akademik Svishtov players
PFC Vidima-Rakovski Sevlievo players
PFC Kaliakra Kavarna players
FC Botev Vratsa players
FC Dunav Ruse players
PFC Litex Lovech players
First Professional Football League (Bulgaria) players
Second Professional Football League (Bulgaria) players